SK Babīte is a Latvian football club. They are based in the Latvian town of Babīte near Rīga and competed in the highest division of Latvian football (the Virslīga) and the Latvian Football Cup. Their home stadium is located in Piņķi, but due to incompatibility with Virslīga standards the team plays its home matches in Rīga's Skonto Stadium. On 22 June 2017, they were excluded from the Latvian Higher League as the Latvian Football Federation received a notice from UEFA's Betting Fraud Detection System for 6 separate games involving Babite.

Players

First-team squad
As of 1 September 2016.

References

 http://lff.lv/lv/turniri/viriesu-turniri/komanda-lv-pirma-liga/sastavi/sk-babite/?year

Football clubs in Latvia
Association football clubs established in 2015
2015 establishments in Latvia
SK Babite